Tomáš Veszelka (born 6 July 1995) is a Slovak athlete specialising in the triple jump. He reached the final at the 2018 European Championships finishing eighth. In addition, he finished fourth at the 2017 European U23 Championships.

His personal bests in the event are 16.74 metres outdoors (+0.4 m/s, Székesfehérvár 2019) and 16.78 metres indoors (Glasgow 2019).

International competitions

References

1995 births
Living people
Slovak male triple jumpers
People from Lučenec
Sportspeople from the Banská Bystrica Region
Athletes (track and field) at the 2015 European Games
European Games medalists in athletics
European Games silver medalists for Slovakia
Competitors at the 2017 Summer Universiade